The Arca Foundation is a progressive American philanthropic foundation. Founded in 1952 as the Nancy Reynolds Bagley Foundation, the foundation was renamed the Arca Foundation in 1958. The foundation was founded with assets from the R. J. Reynolds Tobacco Company. Since its inception, the Arca Foundation has made grants totaling over $50 million. The foundation was formerly headed by Democrat Donna Edwards, who in 2008 took a leave of absence from Arca to run successfully for Maryland's 4th congressional district.

In the 1980s, the Arca Foundation funded lobbying efforts against U.S. policy in Central America. Since 1994, the Arca Foundation has donated millions of dollars to organizations and Democratic politicians working to lift sanctions against Cuba and normalize relations between Cuba and the United States.

References

External links
Arca Foundation on Influence Explorer
Arca Foundation on Open Secrets

Political and economic research foundations in the United States
Organizations established in 1952
Progressivism in the United States
R. J. Reynolds Tobacco Company
1952 establishments in the United States